Blooming Grove High School is a 3A public high school located in Blooming Grove, Texas. It is part of the Blooming Grove Independent School District located in northwest Navarro County. In 2011, the school was rated "Academically Acceptable" by the Texas Education Agency.

Athletics 
The Blooming Grove Lions compete in various sports, including cross country, volleyball, football, basketball, powerlifting, track, softball, and baseball.

State titles
 Softball – 1996 (2A)
 One Act Play – 1965 (B)

State finalists
 Softball – 1997 (2A), 1998 (2A)

References

External links
 

Public high schools in Texas
Schools in Navarro County, Texas